Ifeanyichukwu Ndubuisi Chikezie Aniebo, commonly known as I. N. C. Aniebo (born 31 January 1939), is a Nigerian novelist and short story writer, who has been called "the master craftsman of the Nigerian short story".

Aniebo trained as an artillery officer; his first stories were written under a pseudonym to avoid censorship. He fought for Biafra in the Nigerian Civil War, and The Anonymity of Sacrifice (1974) gives a sense of the horrors and personal conflicts of that war. Aniebo subsequently studied at the University of California, Los Angeles, before returning to Nigeria in 1979 to teach Creative Writing and Literature at the English Department of the University of Port Harcourt.

Works
Novels
 The Anonymity of Sacrifice. African Writers Series 148. London: Heinemann Educational, 1974.
 The Journey Within. African Writers Series 206. London: Heinemann, 1978.
 Rearguard Actions. Ibadan, Nigeria: Heinemann Educational Books, 1998.

Short story collections
 Of Wives, Talismans and the Dead. London: Heinemann, 1983.
 Man of the Market: Short Stories. Port Harcourt: Pam Unique, 1994.

Individual short stories
 "The Jealous Goddess," in Spear (Lagos), October 1963.
 "My Mother," in Sunday Times (Lagos), 22 December 1963.
 "The Ring," in Nigeria Magazine (Lagos), December 1964.
 *"The Peacemakers," in Nigeria Magazine (Lagos), December 1965.
 "Shadows," in Black Orpheus 20 (Lagos), 1966.
 "Mirage," in Nigeria Magazine (Lagos), March 1966.
 "The Outing," in Happy Home and Family Life (Lagos), May 1972.
 "Happy Survival, Brother," in Ufahamu (Los Angeles), vol. 7, no. 3, 1977.

References

External links
Ugochukwu Ejinkeonye, Interview with I. N. C. Aniebo, ChickenBones: A Journal (interview conducted July 1995, posted online 3 September 2006).

1939 births
Living people
Nigerian male novelists
Nigerian male short story writers
Nigerian short story writers
20th-century Nigerian novelists
University of California, Los Angeles alumni
Academic staff of the University of Port Harcourt
20th-century short story writers
20th-century male writers